Philip Leslie Hale (1865–1931) was an American Impressionist artist, writer and teacher. His work was part of the painting event in the art competition at the 1932 Summer Olympics.

Biography
Hale was born in Boston, the son of prominent minister Edward Everett Hale, the brother of artist Ellen Day Hale, and was related to Nathan Hale and Harriet Beecher Stowe. He studied at the School of the Museum of Fine Arts in Boston under Edmund Tarbell, and with Kenyon Cox and J. Alden Weir at the Art Students League of New York. Beginning in 1887, he studied in Paris for five years, and during the summers painted at Giverny, where he was influenced by the palette and brushwork of Claude Monet. In the 1890s he painted his most experimental works, which evidenced an interest in Neo-impressionism and Symbolism.

Hale returned to Boston in 1893. Formerly engaged to Ethel Reed, he instead married fellow artist Lilian Westcott Hale in 1902, and they rented adjoining studios in Boston. Hale taught at the Museum School in Boston, as well as the Metropolitan Museum of Art and the Pennsylvania Academy of the Fine Arts; among his Boston pupils was Mary Bradish Titcomb. He wrote art criticism and published Jan Vermeer of Delft in 1913, the first monograph on the artist published in the United States.

See also
 Impressionism

References

Dearinger, David Bernard. Paintings and Sculpture in the Collection of the National Academy of Design: 1826-1925, Hudson Hills, 2004. 
Philip Leslie Hale papers, Smithsonian Archives of American Art In 1917 he was elected into the National Academy of Design as an Associate member.

External links

 American Impressionism and garden movement

1865 births
1931 deaths
19th-century American painters
American male painters
American Impressionist painters
Painters from Massachusetts
Artists from Boston
School of the Museum of Fine Arts at Tufts alumni
Art Students League of New York alumni
Beecher family
20th-century American painters
Boston School (painting)
Olympic competitors in art competitions